Arne Carlsson (born c. 1939) is a former international motorcycle speedway rider from Sweden.

Speedway career 
Carlsson reached the final of the Speedway World Championship on three occasions during the 1959 Individual Speedway World Championship, 1962 Individual Speedway World Championship and 1963 Individual Speedway World Championship.

He rode in the top tier of British Speedway, riding for Swindon Robins.

World Final Appearances

Individual World Championship
 1959 -  London, Wembley Stadium - 7th - 8pts
 1962 -  London, Wembley Stadium - 13th - 3pts
 1963 -  London, Wembley Stadium - 16th - 1pt

References 

1939 births
Living people
Year of birth uncertain
Swedish speedway riders
Swindon Robins riders
New Cross Rangers riders